"Quid Pro Quo" is the twelfth episode of the American crime comedy-drama television series Terriers. The episode was written by Angela Kang and Leslye Headland, and directed by Adam Arkin. It was first broadcast on FX in the United States on November 24, 2010.

The series is set in Ocean Beach, San Diego and focuses on ex-cop and recovering alcoholic Hank Dolworth (Donal Logue) and his best friend, former criminal Britt Pollack (Michael Raymond-James), who both decide to open an unlicensed private investigation business. In the episode, Hank, Britt and Laura continue working on their case against Zeitlin, which leads to unravelling a bigger conspiracy.

According to Nielsen Media Research, the episode was seen by an estimated 0.542 million household viewers and gained a 0.2/1 ratings share among adults aged 18–49. The episode received critical acclaim, with critics praising the writing, twists, directing, performances and set-up for the next episode.

Plot
Hank (Donal Logue) and Laura (Alison Elliott) are still working on the case against Zeitlin (Michael Gaston). Hank follows Laura as she wants to meet with her source. Laura informs Hank that the architect working on one of their projects is Jason Adler (Loren Dean).

Zeitlin visits Britt in prison, pretending to be his lawyer and paying his bail. He leaves just as Hank and Laura arrive at the station, and he confirms that Zeitlin wants the tape where he threatens Laura's life. They meet with Maggie (Jamie Denbo), who states that Britt could face up to three years in prison for assault and battery. She directs them towards one of her clients, Councilman Sam Albrecht (Scott Klace), who has his own misgivings about Zeitlin. While Hank and Laura meet with Jason, Britt meets with Zeitlin, claiming that the tape does not exist. Zeitlin offers to help with his case if he works for him in investigating a possible source in his office.

Jason tells Hank and Laura that the project has been pressured to meet the dateline, making it feel like he is being watched by some of Zeitlin's associates. As they investigate, they discover that Zeitlin plans to dismantle part of the Ocean Beach territory to make way for a new airport. Britt follows Ashley Barrett (Elizabeth Chomko), Zeitlin's subordinates and possible whistle-blower. Their conversation turns intimate and they have sex. However, she eventually discovers that Zeitlin sent him and kicks him out. Meanwhile, Katie (Laura Allen) tends to Gavin (Zack Silva), who informs her that Britt brutally attacked him, deducing that he thought she slept with him. She visits Gretchen (Kimberly Quinn) to ask for some counseling. 

As Hank and Britt drive, they are called by Laura, who managed to contact the whistle-blower to a liquor store. Hank and Britt arrive, discovering that Laura and Jason arrived first. They are shocked to discover the whistle-blower and Jason dead, and Laura missing. As authorities inspect the scene, Hank and Britt talk with Albrecht. They deduce that Albrecht is working with Zeitlin and informed him of their plans. Hank and Britt then visit Gretchen, who was just notified of Jason's death. Hank consoles a devastated Gretchen, promising to find out what happened. Hank and Britt then visit a local dealer, with Hank using Lindus' bearer bonds to buy weapons.

Reception

Viewers
The episode was watched by 0.542 million viewers, earning a 0.2/1 in the 18-49 rating demographics on the Nielson ratings scale. This means that 0.2 percent of all households with televisions watched the episode, while 1 percent of all households watching television at that time watched it. This was a 26% decrease in viewership from the previous episode, which was watched by 0.725 million viewers with a 0.4/1 in the 18-49 rating demographics.

Critical reviews
"Quid Pro Quo" received critical acclaim. Noel Murray of The A.V. Club gave the episode an "A" grade and wrote, "That's the kind of touch to character and plot that I look for from Terriers — ironic in an old-school way, not a bludgeoning, symbolic one. 'Quid Pro Quo' is full of those little moments that make we who've invested so much in these characters either smile or shudder (or both)." 

Alan Sepinwall of HitFix wrote, "'Quid Pro Quo' is a mess, but in a very good way. It features a complicated Chinatown-style land grab storyline, leans heavily on things we've learned throughout the season, features Hank's plan going off the rails 16 different ways, and has Britt seeming to change allegiances every five seconds. By many reasonable standards, it shouldn't work. But it does." Cory Barker of TV Overmind wrote, "Wow. I was not expecting that at all. You know a show is great when it can shock you the way this week's episode of Terriers  did. This is, hands down, the most underappreciated show on television this fall."

References

External links
 

2010 American television episodes
Terriers episodes